The International Emmy Kids Awards, founded in New York City in 2013, recognize excellence in international children's programming produced initially outside the United States, and are presented annually by International Academy of Television Arts and Sciences. The awards are presented annually in Cannes at MIPtv. They are the only Emmys presented outside the United States.

History 
In previous years, the International Academy had presented a single award for children's programming at its main International Emmy gala in November. In 2013, the academy decided to set up a separate ceremony, with International Emmy Kids Awards handed out in six categories to honor outstanding children's TV programming outside the U.S.

Nominations for the 1st International Emmy Kids Awards were announced on October 8, 2012, by the International Academy of Television Arts & Sciences at a Press Conference at MIPCOM, in Cannes.

In 2020, the International Academy reduced the categories presented to just three: animation, factual & entertainment, and live-action series.

Award categories 
Kids: Animation 
Kids: Factual & Entertainment
Kids: Live-Action

Winners

See also
Children's and Family Emmy Awards

References

External links 
 

Awards established in 2013
International Emmy Awards